Jimmy Harris may refer to:

Sports
 Jimmy Harris (cornerback) (born 1946), former American football cornerback for the Washington Redskins and Cincinnati Bengals
 Jimmy Harris (defensive back) (1934–2011), former American football defensive back for the Philadelphia Eagles, Los Angeles Rams, and Dallas Cowboys
 Jimmy Harris (footballer, born 1907) (1907–?), English footballer who played for West Ham United and Southampton
 Jimmy Harris (footballer, born 1933) (1933–2022), English footballer who played for Everton, Birmingham City and Oldham Athletic

Others
 Jimmy Harris (politician), politician from New Orleans, Louisiana
 Jimmy Harris (EastEnders), fictional character in the UK soap opera EastEnders

See also
 James Harris (disambiguation)